The economic impacts of climate change vary geographically and are difficult to forecast exactly. Researchers have warned that current economic forecasts may seriously underestimate the effects of climate change, and point to the need for new models that give a more accurate picture of potential damages. Nevertheless, one 2018 study found that potential global economic gains if countries implement mitigation strategies to comply with the 2 °C target set at the Paris Agreement are in the vicinity of US$17 trillion per year up to 2100 compared to a very high emission scenario.

Global losses reveal rapidly rising costs due to extreme weather events since the 1970s. Socio-economic factors have contributed to the observed trend of global losses, such as population growth and increased wealth. Part of the growth is also related to regional climatic factors, e.g., changes in precipitation and flooding events. It is difficult to quantify the relative impact of socio-economic factors and climate change on the observed trend. The trend does, however, suggest increasing vulnerability of social systems to climate change.

A 2019 modelling study found that climate change had contributed towards global economic inequality. Wealthy countries in colder regions had either felt little overall economic impact from climate change, or possibly benefited, whereas poor hotter countries very likely grew less than if global warming had not occurred. Part of this observation stems from the fact that greenhouse gas emissions stem mainly from high-income countries while low-income countries are affected by it negatively. 

The total economic impacts from climate change are difficult to estimate, but increase for higher temperature changes. For instance, total damages are estimated to be 90% less if global warming is limited to 1.5 °C compared to 3.66 °C, a warming level chosen to represent no mitigation. One study found a 3.5% reduction in global GDP by the end of the century if warming is limited to 3 °C, excluding the potential effect of tipping points. Another study noted that global economic impact is underestimated by a factor of two to eight when tipping points are excluded from consideration. In the Oxford Economics high emission scenario, a temperature rise of 2 degrees by the year 2050 would reduce global GDP by 2.5% – 7.5%. By the year 2100 in this case, the temperature would rise by 4 degrees, which could reduce the global GDP by 30% in the worst case.

Studies in 2019 suggest that economic damages due to climate change have been underestimated, and may be severe, with the probability of disastrous tail-risk events being nontrivial. Carbon-intensive industries and investors are expected to experience a significant increase in stranded assets with a potential ripple affect throughout the world economy.

Definitions 
The economic impacts of climate change also include any mitigation (for example, limiting the global average temperature below 2 °C) or adaption (for example, building flood defences) employed by nations or groups of nations, which might infer economic consequences.

Distribution of impacts

Climate change impacts can be measured as an economic cost (Smith et al., 2001:936-941). This is particularly well-suited to market impacts, that is impacts that are linked to market transactions and directly affect GDP. Monetary measures of non-market impacts, e.g., impacts on human health and ecosystems, are more difficult to calculate. Other difficulties with impact estimates are listed below:
Knowledge gaps: Calculating distributional impacts requires detailed geographical knowledge, but these are a major source of uncertainty in climate models.
Vulnerability: Compared with developed countries, there is a limited understanding of the potential market sector impacts of climate change in developing countries.
Adaptation: The future level of adaptive capacity in human and natural systems to climate change will affect how society will be impacted by climate change. Assessments may under- or overestimate adaptive capacity, leading to under- or overestimates of positive or negative impacts.
Socioeconomic trends: Future predictions of development affect estimates of future climate change impacts, and in some instances, different estimates of development trends lead to a reversal from a predicted positive, to a predicted negative, impact (and vice versa).

In a literature assessment, Smith et al. (2001:957-958) concluded, with medium confidence, that:
climate change would increase income inequalities between and within countries.
a small increase in global mean temperature (up to 2 °C, measured against 1990 levels) would result in net negative market sector in many developing countries and net positive market sector impacts in many developed countries.
With high confidence, it was predicted that with a medium (2-3 °C) to high level of warming (greater than 3 °C), negative impacts would be exacerbated, and net positive impacts would start to decline and eventually turn negative.

Green companies in Europe outperform those in the United States in terms of green investment and digital uptake. In comparison to the United States, European businesses are less likely to have adopted digital technology, but they are more likely to invest in climate change mitigation or adaptation strategies. In Europe, the proportion of businesses that make green investments and are also digital adopters is slightly greater, at 32%. The same businesses are at 28% in the United States.

81% of the European Investment Bank's Investment Survey respondents cited uncertainty as the most severe obstacle to investment.

A European survey conducted in 2021 found that 45% of young Chinese people, 32% of young Americans, 31% of British, and 25% of Europeans fear they could lose their jobs because of the fight against climate change. Specifically, Europeans aged 20 - 29 (44%) fear they could lose their job if it is incompatible with the need to combat climate change. However, 55% of Europeans believe that initiatives to combat climate change will have a net positive impact on employment, generating more jobs.  

The survey also found that 69% of EU, 71% of UK, 62% of US and 89% of Chinese respondents would support a tax on the items and services that contribute the most to climate change. 

During the green transition, workers in carbon-intensive industries are more likely to lose their jobs. In the years to come, the transition to a low-carbon economy will put more jobs at danger in regions with higher percentages of employment in carbon-intensive industries.

The proportion of enterprises in Central, Southeastern and Eastern Europe who regard the transition to stronger climate regulations as a risk outnumbers the proportion that see it as an opportunity. This is 36% as a risk vs. 18% as an opportunity. In comparison, companies in the EU see it as 32% risk, 29% opportunity. Almost 90% of enterprises in CESEE have already taken steps to cut GHG emissions, which is comparable to the EU average.

Businesses in this region stated in a survey that climate change is having an impact on their business (a "significant impact" for one out of every 10 enterprises), which is lower than the EU (57%).

Non-market impacts

Smith et al. (2001:942) predicted that climate change would likely result in pronounced non-market impacts. Most of impacts were predicted to be negative. The literature assessment by Smith et al. (2001) suggested that climate change would cause substantial negative health impacts in developing countries. Smith et al. (2001) noted that few of the studies they reviewed had adequately accounted for adaptation. In a literature assessment, Confalonieri et al. (2007:415) found that in the studies that had included health impacts, those impacts contributed substantially to the total costs of climate change.

Market sector
In 2019 the International Labour Organization published a report titled: "Working on a warmer planet: The impact of heat stress on labour productivity and decent work", in which it claims that even if the rise in temperature will be limited to 1.5 degree, by the year 2030, Climate Change will cause losses in productivity reaching 2.2% of all the working hours, every year. This is equivalent to 80 million full time jobs, or 2,400 billion dollars. The sector expected to be most affected is agriculture, which is projected to account for 60% of this loss. The construction sector is also projected to be severely impacted and accounts for 19% of projected losses. Other sectors that are most at risk are environmental goods and services, refuse collection, emergency, repair work, transport, tourism, sports and some forms of industrial work.

In 2020 McKinsey & Company issued a report about the current and future impacts of climate change on the economy. The report says that trillions of dollars and hundreds of millions of lives are at risk. Climate change should strongly influence the decisions of the business and governmental leaders. The report, for example, found that socioeconomic impacts can increase by 2 - 20 times compare to today level by 2050.

Climate change driven migration possibly helped to trigger Brexit - the exit of Britain from European Union. The uncertainty about Brexit has shrunk the British economy in 2019, and may cause it to contract further in the future Brexit can make it shrink it much more.

In the European Investment Bank's Investment report 2020-2021, it was found that climate change and related weather events have had a significant influence on 23% of European companies, compared to 14% in the United States. Another 35% of European companies consider the consequences of climate change to be minimal.

Agriculture

Depending on underlying assumptions, studies of the economic impacts of a doubling in atmospheric carbon dioxide (CO2) from pre-industrial levels conclude that this would have a slightly negative to moderately positive aggregate effect (i.e., total impacts across all regions) on the agricultural sector (Smith et al., 2001:938). This aggregate effect hides substantial regional differences, with benefits mostly predicted in the developed world and strongly negative impacts for populations poorly connected to regional and global trading systems. Poorer countries are more exposed to the weather because of the important role of agriculture and water resources in the economy.

Other sectors

A number of other sectors will be affected by climate change, including the livestock, forestry, and fisheries industries. Other sectors sensitive to climate change include the energy, insurance, tourism and recreation industries. The aggregate impact of climate change on most of these sectors is highly uncertain (Schneider et al., 2007:790).

Regions

"Although greenhouse gas emissions per person are higher in high-income countries, relative impacts of climate change are greater in low-income countries". This is because "low-income countries tend to be in tropical zones closer to the equator" and, due to their economic position, 'low-income' are less able to adapt. 
Africa: In Africa, coastal facilities are economically significant. In a literature assessment, Desanker et al. (2001:490) concluded that climate change would result in sea-level rise, coastal erosion, saltwater intrusion, and flooding. Desanker et al. (2001) predicted that these changes would have a significant impact on African communities and economies.
Coasts and low-lying areas: In literature assessment, Nicholls et al. (2007:338-339) concluded that the socio-economic impacts of climate change on coastal and low-lying areas would be overwhelmingly adverse. Some benefits, however, were noted, e.g., the opening of new ocean routes due to reduced sea ice. Compared with developed countries, the protection costs associated with projected sea level rise were found to be relatively higher for developing countries.
Polar regions: Anisimov et al. (2001:804) reviewed the literature on climate change impacts in polar regions. With very high confidence, they concluded that the impact of climate change on infrastructure would increase economic costs. New opportunities for trading and shipping across the Arctic ocean, lower operational costs for the oil and gas industry, lower heating costs, and easier access for ship-based tourism, were expected to bring economic benefits.
Small islands: In a literature assessment, Mimura et al. (2007:689) concluded, with high confidence, that on small islands, tourism would, for the most part, be negatively affected by climate change. On many small islands, tourism is a major contributor to GDP and employment.

Other systems and sectors

Freshwater resources: In this sector, costs and benefits of climate change may take several forms, including monetary costs and benefits, and ecosystem and human impacts, e.g., loss of aquatic species and household flooding. In a literature assessment, Kundzewicz et al. (2007:191) found that few of these costs had been estimated in monetary terms. In respect to the water supply, they predicted that costs would very likely exceed benefits. Predicted costs included the potential need for infrastructure investments to protect against floods and droughts.
Industry, settlements and society:
In a literature assessment, Wilbanks et al. (2007:377) concluded, with high confidence, that the economic costs of extreme weather events, at large national or large regional scale, would be unlikely to exceed more than a few percent of the total economy in the year of the event, except for possible abrupt changes. In smaller locations, particularly developing countries, it was estimated with high confidence that, in the year of the extreme event, short-run damages could amount to more than 25% GDP.
Infrastructure: According to Tol (2008), roads, airport runways, railway lines and pipelines, (including oil pipelines, sewers, water mains etc.) may require increased maintenance and renewal as they become subject to greater temperature variation and are exposed to weather that they were not designed for.

Aggregate impacts

Aggregating impacts adds up the total impact of climate change across sectors and/or regions (IPCC, 2007a:76). In producing aggregate impacts, there are a number of difficulties, such as predicting the ability of societies to adapt climate change, and estimating how future economic and social development will progress (Smith et al., 2001:941). It is also necessary for the researcher to make subjective value judgements over the importance of impacts occurring in different economic sectors, in different regions, and at different times.

In 2020 the World Economic Forum ranked climate change as the biggest risk to economy and society.

A United States government report in November 2018 raised the possibility of US GDP going down 10% as a result of the warming climate, including huge shifts in geography, demographics and technology.

Smith et al. (2001) assessed the literature on the aggregate impacts of climate change. With medium confidence, they concluded that a small increase in global average temperature (up to 2 °C, measured against 1990 levels) would result in an aggregate market sector impact of plus or minus a few percent of world GDP. Smith et al. (2001) found that for a small to medium (2-3 °C) global average temperature increase, some studies predicted small net positive market impacts. Most studies they assessed predicted net damages beyond a medium temperature increase, with further damages for greater (more than 3 °C) temperature rises.

With low confidence, Smith et al. (2001) concluded that the non-market impacts of climate change would be negative. Smith et al. (2001:942) decided that studies might have understated the true costs of climate change, e.g., by not correctly estimating the impact of extreme weather events. It was thought possible that some of the positive impacts of climate change had been overlooked, and that adaptive capacity had possibly been underestimated.

Some of the studies assessed by Schneider et al. (2007:790) predicted that gross world product could increase for 1-3 °C warming (relative to temperatures over the 1990-2000 period), largely because of aggregate benefits in the agricultural sector. In the view of Schneider et al. (2007), these estimates carried low confidence. Stern (2007) assessed climate change impacts using the basic economics of risk premiums (Yohe et al., 2007:821). He found that unmitigated climate change could result in a reduction in welfare equivalent to a persistent average fall in global per-capita consumption of at least 5%. The study by Stern (2007) has received both criticism and support from other economists (see Stern Review for more information). IPCC (2007a) concluded that "Aggregate estimates of costs mask significant differences in impacts across sectors, regions and populations and very likely underestimate damage costs because they cannot include many non-quantifiable impacts."

Richard S Tol has twice revised his figure incorporated as fig 10-1 in IPCC reports from his "The Economic Effects of Climate Change". In the second revision he says "The IPCC discussion of this figure offers some useful cautions about interpretation:" and quotes that as saying:

"Estimates agree on the size of the impact (small relative to economic growth), and 17 of the 20 impact estimates shown in Figure 10-1 are negative. Losses accelerate with greater warming, and estimates diverge. The new estimates have slightly widened the uncertainty about the economic impacts of climate. Welfare impacts have been estimated with different methods, ranging from expert elicitation to econometric studies and simulation models. Different studies include different aspects of the impacts of climate change, but no estimate is complete; most experts speculate that excluded impacts are on balance negative. Estimates across the studies reflect different assumptions about inter-sectoral, inter-regional, and inter-temporal interactions, about adaptation, and about the monetary values of impacts. Aggregate estimates of costs mask significant differences in impacts across sectors, regions, countries, and populations. Relative to their income, economic impacts are higher for poorer people."

Marginal impacts

The social cost of carbon (SCC) is an aggregate measure of the impacts of climate change. It is defined as the incremental (or marginal) social cost of emitting one more tonne of carbon (as carbon dioxide) into the atmosphere at any point in time (Yohe et al., 2007:821). Different GHGs have different social costs. For example, due to their greater physical capacity to trap infrared radiation, HFCs have a considerably higher social cost per tonne of emission than carbon dioxide. Another physical property that affects the social cost is the atmospheric lifetime of the GHG.

Estimates of the SCC are highly uncertain and cover a wide range (Klein et al., 2007:756). The discrepancies in estimates can be broken down into normative and empirical parameters (Fisher et al., 2007:232). Key normative parameters include the aggregation of impacts across time and regions. The other parameters relate to the empirical validity of SCC estimates. This reflects the poor quality of data on which estimates are based, and the difficulty in predicting how society will react to future climate change. In a literature assessment, Klein et al. (2007:757) placed low confidence in SCC estimates.

Sensitivity analysis

Sensitivity analysis allows assumptions to be changed in aggregate analysis to see what effect it has on results (Smith et al., 2001:943):
Shape of the damage function: This relates impacts to the change in atmospheric greenhouse gas (GHG) concentrations. There is little information on what the correct shape (e.g., linear or cubic) of this function is. Compared with a linear function, a cubic function shows relatively small damages for small increases in temperature, but more sharply increasing damages at greater temperatures.
Rate of climate change: This is believed to be an important determinant of impacts, often because it affects the time available for adaptation.
Discount rate and time horizon: Models used in aggregate studies suggest that the most severe impacts of climate change will occur in the future. Estimated impacts are therefore sensitive to the time horizon (how far a given study projects impacts into the future) and the discount rate (the value assigned to consumption in the future versus consumption today).
Welfare criteria: Aggregate analysis is particularly sensitive to the weighting (i.e., relative importance) of impacts occurring in different regions and at different times. Studies by Fankhauser et al. (1997) and Azar (1999) found that greater concern over the distribution of impacts lead to more severe predictions of aggregate impacts.
Uncertainty: Usually assessed through sensitivity analysis, but can also be viewed as a hedging problem. EMF (1997) found that deciding how to hedge depends on society's aversion to climate change risks, and the potential costs of insuring against these risks.

Advantages and disadvantages

There are a number of benefits of using aggregated assessments to measure climate change impacts (Smith et al., 2001:954). They allow impacts to be directly compared between different regions and times. Impacts can be compared with other environmental problems and also with the costs of avoiding those impacts. A problem of aggregated analyses is that they often reduce different types of impacts into a small number of indicators. It can be argued that some impacts are not well-suited to this, e.g., the monetization of mortality and loss of species diversity. On the other hand, Pearce (2003:364) argued that where there are monetary costs of avoiding impacts, it is not possible to avoid monetary valuation of those impacts.

Incomplete estimates

As stated, economic estimates of climate change impacts are incomplete. Analysts have used integrated assessment models to estimate the economic impacts of climate change. These models do include estimates of some impacts, for instance, the effects of climate change on agriculture. In other areas, models exclude some impacts. An example is the possibility that climate change could lead to migration or conflict.

The Stern Review for the British Government also predicted that world GDP would be reduced by several percent due to climate related costs. However, their calculations may omit ecological effects that are difficult to quantify economically (such as human deaths or loss of biodiversity) or whose economic consequences will manifest slowly. Therefore, their calculations may be an underestimate.

Relative impacts

The effects of climate change can be compared to other effects on human society and the environment. Future socio-economic development may strongly affect climate change impacts. For example, projections of the number of people at risk of hunger vary significantly according to assumptions over future socio-economic development.

Some ecosystems are likely to be especially affected by climate change (e.g., coral reefs). In the long-term (beyond 2050), climate change may become the major driver for biodiversity loss globally.

The socio-economic impacts of climate change are likely to be greatest in communities that face other stresses. For example, poor communities are vulnerable to extreme weather events, and are likely to be especially affected by climate change. In general, however, other changes (e.g., demographic and technological) are likely to have a greater effect on human society than climate change. On the other hand, major ("non-marginal") impacts could occur with abrupt changes in natural and social systems. Scientific understanding of abrupt changes is limited.

Another consideration is how vulnerability to climate change varies with scale. At local scales, extreme weather events can have a significant impact, especially in vulnerable locations. Another potentially significant impact is the long-term effect of sea-level rise on low-lying coastal areas.

Comments on relative impacts

Bostrom (2009) comments that:Even the Stern Review on the Economics of Climate Change, a report prepared for the British Government which has been criticized by some as overly pessimistic, estimates that under the assumption of business-as-usual with regard to emissions, global warming will reduce welfare by an amount equivalent to a permanent reduction in per capita consumption of between 5 and 20%. In absolute terms, this would be a huge harm.  Yet over the course of the twentieth century, world GDP grew by some 3,700%, and per capita world GDP rose by some 860%. It seems safe to say that (absent a radical overhaul of our best current scientific models of the Earth’s climate system) whatever negative economic effects global warming will have, they will be completely swamped by other factors that will influence economic growth rates in this century.Other analysts have commented on the risks of climate change damages. The German Advisory Council on Global Change (WBGU, 2007) comments that:Although [the Stern Review's] figures tend to be at the upper end of the scale compared to other estimates currently circulating, even [its] quantitative estimates fail to include the economic upheavals that would arise as a consequence of climate-induced conflicts or might be triggered by climate-induced migration.

Several analysts have emphasized the importance of "catastrophic" risks due to climate change. WBGU (2007) states that due to climate change, "significant impairment" of the global economy is a "distinct possibility". Weitzman (2012) has commented:Climate change potentially affects the whole worldwide portfolio of utility by threatening to drive all of planetary welfare to disastrously low levels in the most extreme scenarios. With global climate change, diversification [of risk] is limited because all eggs are inherently in one basket.

Estimates 
In 2017, climate change contributed to extreme weather events causing at least $100 billion in damages. The impact can be seen over a longer time period, where "over the past 20 years, an estimated 500,000 people have died and US$3.5 trillion was lost as a result of extreme weather events". Increasing temperature will lead to accelerating economic losses. A 2017 survey of independent economists looking at the effects of climate change found that future damage estimates range "from 2% to 10% or more of global GDP per year."

One 2020 study estimated economic losses due to climate change could be between 127 and 616 trillion dollars extra until 2100 with current commitments, compared to 1.5 °C or well below 2 °C compatible action action. Failure to implement current commitments raises economic losses to 150–792 trillion dollars until 2100. In this study, mitigation was achieved by countries optimising their own economy.

See also 

Ecoflation
Economics of global warming
Effects of climate change
Environmental Security and Peace

References

Sources 
 Climate Change and Capable Development by Ananda Kumar Biswas
. Report website.

 
 . Archived

 .
 .
 .
. Report website.
.

Further reading 

 "Central Banks and Climate Risks: Some researchers look at climate change and see economic uncertainty. Central banks are beginning to take notice", Econ Focus, Federal Reserve Bank of Richmond, Second/Third Quarter 2019.
 Maximilian Auffhammer. 2018. "Quantifying Economic Damages from Climate Change." Journal of Economic Perspectives—Volume 32, Number 4—Fall 2018—Pages 33–52.
 Solomon Hsiang and Robert E. Kopp. 2018. "An Economist's Guide to Climate Change Science." Journal of Economic Perspectives—Volume 32, Number 4—Fall 2018—Pages 3–32

Economics and climate change